Andrew James Colvin (April 30, 1808 in Coeymans, Albany County, New York – July 8, 1889 in Albany, New York) was an American lawyer and politician from New York.

Life
He was the son of James Colvin (1776–1846) and Catherine Huyck (Verplanck) Colvin (1778–1882). He attended The Albany Academy. Then he studied law in the office of Van Buren & Butler, was admitted to the bar, and practiced in Albany. He married Rosina M. Alling (1810–1843), and they had two children.

He was Corporation Counsel of Albany in 1842. On September 2, 1845, he married Margaret Crane Alling (1812–1900), a sister of his first wife, and their son was Verplanck Colvin (1847–1920), the ideator of the New York Forest Preserve.

Andrew J. Colvin was District Attorney of Albany County from 1846 to 1847, and from 1851 to 1853; and a member of the New York State Senate (13th D.) in 1860 and 1861.

He was buried at the Grove Cemetery in Coeymans.

Assemblyman John Colvin (1752–1814) was his grandfather.

Sources
 The New York Civil List compiled by Franklin Benjamin Hough, Stephen C. Hutchins and Edgar Albert Werner (1867; pg. 358, 442 and 529)
 Biographical Sketches of the State Officers and Members of the Legislature of the State of New York by William D. Murphy (1861; pg. 42ff)
 Colvin genealogy at Schenectady History
 Grove Cemetery records at Betty Fink
 OBITUARY; ANDREW J. COLVIN in NYT on July 21, 1889

External links

1808 births
1889 deaths
Democratic Party New York (state) state senators
Politicians from Albany, New York
Albany County District Attorneys
People from Coeymans, New York
19th-century American politicians
Lawyers from Albany, New York
The Albany Academy alumni
19th-century American lawyers